Collier Hudson Young (August 19, 1908 – December 25, 1980) was an American film producer and writer, who worked on many films in the 1950s, before becoming a television producer for such shows as NBC's Ironside and CBS's The Wild, Wild West, as well as the supernatural anthology series One Step Beyond (1959–61).

Biography
 
Young was the son of Mr. and Mrs. William T. Young who in 1938 lived in Indianapolis, Indiana.  He went to Dartmouth College and graduated in 1930. Collier Young was originally an advertiser before he got into film producing and writing.

Young was married five times: to Ruth Valerie Edmunds of Toronto, Canada, on May 3, 1938, in New York City, to actress and director, Ida Lupino, from 1948 to 1951, to actress Joan Fontaine from 1952 to 1961 and businesswoman and former model, Marjory Ann "Meg" Marsh, in 1965.  Young's film production credits included Outrage (1950) and The Hitch-Hiker (1953), both with Lupino as director. He produced the movies Huk! (1956) and The Halliday Brand (1957).

After his divorce from Lupino, Young was executive director of her 1957–58 CBS sitcom Mr. Adams and Eve, co-starring Lupino's then-husband, Howard Duff. Elements of his screenplay for The Bigamist mined his serial relationships with Lupino and Fontaine, who played the deceived wives of that film.

He was creator of the long-running TV series Ironside, starring Raymond Burr. Young also produced the television show, The Rogues, in 1964–65, starring Charles Boyer, David Niven, Gig Young, Robert Coote, and Gladys Cooper. The Rogues won the Golden Globe award for "Best TV Show" in 1965.

Death
Young died on December 25, 1980, as the result of a road accident, at age 72.

References

External links

 Photograph of Young and Joan Fontaine
 

1908 births
1980 deaths
De Havilland family
Road incident deaths in California
Writers from Asheville, North Carolina
American film producers
Burials at Arlington National Cemetery
20th-century American businesspeople